Sverre Holmsen (1906–1992) was a Swedish writer born in Transvaal, South Africa and brought up in Norway and Sweden. He became a Swedish citizen 1912. 

In 1945 he married the artist and writer Agda Göthlin (1920–1975). He was previously married to Margit Holm in 1928. Since 1922 he travelled and worked all around the world and was an avid supporter of global unity.

The main part of his books draws inspiration from Polynesia. Sverre Holmsen lived in Tahiti for several years. He very much admired the people in the Pacific region, along with their habits, history and culture.
Sverre Holmsen was also an early environmentalist. In the main part of his works he points out the dangers of modern ways of living. Even in his earliest works he expressed critical views about technical development and the exploitation of natural resources.

In a similar way he was also advocating democracy and Human rights.

17 of his books have been published in Swedish language and have been translated to 12 languages.

He is the older brother of Egil Holmsen, Swedish film director, screenwriter, journalist, author and actor.

In his latter years he became a Bahá’í follower.

Books
1966 "Morialand" (in Swedish)
1969 "De upplysta horisonterna" (in Swedish)
1961 "Globen runt" ( in Swedish)
1949 "Polynesian Trade Wind" London, J.Barrie. 1949.
1952 "The Island beyond the Horizon" London, J. Barrie . 1952.
1951 "Singing Coral". London. J.Barrie .1951.

See also 
 Swedish literature

1906 births
1992 deaths
South African emigrants to Sweden
Swedish Bahá'ís